Rev. Ernest Philip Aderman  (né Adermann; 22 May 1894 – 27 February 1968) was a New Zealand politician of the National Party.

Biography

Early life and family
Aderman was born in Queensland, Australia, in 1894. He was one of eight children born to German immigrant parents Emilie (née Litzow) and Carl Friederich Adermann. His younger brother Charles Adermann entered politics in Australia. He received his education at Lapwood Primary (Queensland), and at Church of Christ Theological College (Melbourne), from where he obtained a diploma in theology. He attended the University of Queensland (Brisbane) between 1920 and 1925, and graduated with a BA. During his student years, he helped out on his parents' farm, and later served the church in Auburn, Sydney.

He married Phyllis May Lowther at the Ann Street Church of Christ, Brisbane, on 8 March 1927. The couple arrived in Wellington, New Zealand, on 13 March 1928 by the Marama.

Life in New Zealand
Aderman lectured at the Church of Christ Theological College in Glenleith, Dunedin, and ministered in South Dunedin. From 1930, he served the church at Dominion Road, Auckland. He was President of the Churches of Christ in 1936. During World War II, he was a chaplain to the 2nd Taranaki Regiment.

Political career

He won the New Plymouth seat in an upset victory in 1943 over Rev. Fred Frost, who was also a Christian minister. He represented the New Plymouth electorate from 1943 until he retired in 1966. Despite his initial win in 1943 being considered a shock result he went on to become New Plymouth's longest ever serving MP.

In 1953, Aderman was awarded the Queen Elizabeth II Coronation Medal.

In 1957, he was Senior Whip, and from 1958 to 1960, he was Junior Whip under Geoff Gerard. In 1961 he was one of ten National MPs to vote with the Opposition and remove capital punishment for murder from the Crimes Bill that the Second National Government had introduced.

Later life and death
Aderman was appointed an Officer of the Order of the British Empire, for public and political services, in the 1967 New Year Honours.

Aderman died on 27 February 1968, and his ashes were buried at Te Henui Cemetery, New Plymouth.

Notes

References

This collection [housed at the Alexander Turnbull Library in Wellington] contains a pamphlet authored by Aderman.

1894 births
1968 deaths
Australian emigrants to New Zealand
New Zealand National Party MPs
New Zealand military personnel of World War II
New Zealand military chaplains
New Zealand Officers of the Order of the British Empire
People from Queensland
New Zealand members of the Churches of Christ
Australian members of the Churches of Christ
University of Queensland alumni
Unsuccessful candidates in the 1938 New Zealand general election
Candidates in the 1941 New Zealand general election
Members of the New Zealand House of Representatives
New Zealand MPs for North Island electorates
Burials at Te Henui Cemetery
New Zealand people of German descent